Jenna Nicole Day (born October 3, 1991) is an American beauty pageant contestant from Louisville, Kentucky, named Miss Kentucky 2013 on June 29, succeeding Jessica Casebolt. She was a Top 15 Finalist in the 2014 Miss America pageant. Her platform was "Improving the Lives of Special Needs Children".

References

External links
 

1991 births
Living people
American beauty pageant winners
Kentucky beauty pageant winners
Beauty pageants in Kentucky
Miss America 2014 delegates
Miss Kentucky winners
People from Louisville, Kentucky
University of Kentucky alumni